Taking Me Higher may refer to:

"Taking Me Higher", by Barclay James Harvest from Gone to Earth 1977
"Taking Me Higher", by Illenium from Awake 2017

See also
Take Me Higher (disambiguation)